Night Owls is a 1930 American Pre-Code Laurel and Hardy short film. It was filmed in October and November 1929, and released January 4, 1930.

Plot
Police officer Edgar Kennedy is warned by his police chief to make arrests to stop a burglary epidemic on his patch or face the sack. Kennedy comes across vagrants Laurel and Hardy that night and persuades them to rob the chief's house to get in his boss's good books. The boys, believing it to be too dangerous, at first refuse. After Kennedy threatens them with ninety days on "the rockpile," and assures them he will get them released after they're caught, they agree to the ruse. Stan and Ollie encounter various problems but after various complications, the chief catches Kennedy with various valuables in his house, while the boys manage somehow to escape.

International versions 
The film was also released in an alternate Spanish version, Ladrones, expanded to nearly four reels in length instead of the English two reels. The film was also released in an Italian version, Ladroni, and in an Esperanto version Ŝtelistoj, which are both now lost. The foreign versions retained not only the headliners, but Edgar Kennedy and James Finlayson as well. The English and Spanish versions are available on DVD.

Cast
 Stan Laurel as Stan Laurel
 Oliver Hardy as Oliver "Ollie" Hardy
 Edgar Kennedy as Officer Kennedy
 James Finlayson as Butler Meadows
 Anders Randolf as the Police Captain

Production
This was the first film to use their celebrated theme tune, "The 'Ku-Ku' Song", written by Marvin Hatley. The Film Classics reissue print features the instrumental version of Marvin Hatley's "Honolulu Baby" from the Sons of the Desert soundtrack in place of "The 'Ku-Ku' Song."

References

External links 
 
 
 
 

1930 films
1930 comedy films
American black-and-white films
Films directed by James Parrott
Laurel and Hardy (film series)
Metro-Goldwyn-Mayer short films
Films with screenplays by H. M. Walker
1930 short films
American comedy short films
1930s English-language films
1930s American films